Ona or One (sometimes Oøy or Oni) is an island in Øygarden municipality in Vestland county, Norway. The  island lies in the Øygarden archipelago just north of the island of Blomøyna and south of Alvøyna. The Hjeltefjorden lies east of the island and the North Sea and some smaller island lie to the west. The southern portion of the island of Ona is dominated by the Kollsnes natural gas processing facility.

See also
List of islands of Norway

References

Islands of Vestland
Øygarden